Kecskeméti Testedző Egyesület, commonly known as Kecskeméti TE or simply Kecskemét, is a sports club based in Kecskemét, Hungary. It is most famous for its football team which competes in the Nemzeti Bajnokság I, the first tier of Hungarian football. Kecskeméti TE's highest achievement to-date is winning the Magyar Kupa in the 2010–11 season, and gaining entry into the Europa League.

History

Early years
Pages of Kecskemét wrote on 6 May 1871, "company wants to play soccer in our city into an older fellow-citizens, which the company exercised twice a week he throws up and running." This experiment, however, proved unsuccessful. In 1904, they played the first football match in Kecskemét, against Budapest III. District High School defeated the team of local Piarist High School. In May 1910, the first football game between the clubs was held in Kecskemét.

The club was founded on 11 June 1911, and attracted primarily local workers as players in the early years. The first managing director was Ferenc Kéry. The first colours of the club were red and green. The current colours have been used since 1913.
The first match was played on 15 August 1911, in which Kecskeméti TE lost to KSC by 1–0. The second match was won 5–1 against Szolnoki MÁV.

On 29 July 1913, Kecskeméti TE merged with the other team from Kecskemét, KSC. During World War I, the team was formed with mainly under 18 players. On 11 April 1926, the first stadium was inaugurated, and the first match was played against the local rival Ceglédi RC. During this period, Hungarian national football team player Lajos Kovács played here. From 1945 the team played its matches near the local railway station.

In the 1946–47 season the team was promoted to the Nemzeti Bajnokság II (the second division) for the first time in the history of the club. On 28 June 1949, the two teams of Kecskemét merged. The new name of the team became KszTE. The colours of the team were blue and red. One of the best player during that time was Máté Fenyvesi (former player of the Ferencváros). On 11 January 1954, the team changed its name to Kecskeméti Kinizsi.

In 1966, the team was promoted to the Nemzeti Bajnokság II after being relegated to the third division in the previous years. In 1967, the team reached the semi-finals in the Hungarian Cup. KSC, the other club in town, was founded in 1972. The two teams became archrivals in the second and third league until their merger in 1999. KTE was always supported by local workers during these years. In the 1990s the team played in the local division and in the third division.

Chaotic times

In 1922, Gyula Kovács decided to build his own track club with Pál Dömötör and others. Donations of today's Works facility located in Garden City on April 11, 1926, inaugurated Cegléd matches against MOVE.

The teams played two wars between the Central and Southern District championship. At that time, today's system of consecutive championships did not exist (up until 1942). KTE was the mid team within the local league rivals 1929–30. The team lost twice, but came back the following season. During World War II, several team members were drafted or recruited forced labor.  Other team members came from labor camps. By the end of the war, the home team was as composed of Lacza, Mészáros, Szabó, Majtány, Huszti, Józsa, Kun, Karaizsa, Márkli II, Boda and Miklós. At the time, the team played a good offensive game, but a poorly performing security marked KTE's game.

After the war, Jenő Kovács became the association's president, and Laszlo Baron led the professional football department. The KTE football team on October 28, 1945, from Kecskemét played matches closer to the center of the park next to the track Noszlopy Gaspar. The 1946–47 NB II was the first winning season in the team's history. The first Hungarian pools coupons (5 October 1947) included in the KTE–Hungarian Textile match, which ended with a draw. This was the beginning of decades of cooperation with the KTE and the Cannery in Kecskemét. The club is the foundation of the location where the 35th anniversary of the Katona József Theatre ceremony was held.

Under Socialism

On 28 June 1949, the United Kecskemét's two teams, the KTE and the KAC, formed a new club named KszTe. The team's new color scheme was red and blue, and József Lakó was appointed president. One of the strongest players in the two years in Kecskemét was Máté Fenyvesi, who later confirmed the Ferencvárosi TC. On 11 January 1954, the club's name was changed to Kinizsi Kecskemét. The team this year dropped out of the second class, and only on 2 December 1956 could the name and colors of the original proposal of László Tóth be reused.

In 1961, a torchlight parade was presented to celebrate that the club's 50-year anniversary. The defense had the better performing sub-group.

The KTE quickly returned and won the Southeast NB III group, but, because of reorganization, could not be taken back to the second class. In 1964, the team fell in the county championship, but in 1966, it was back in the NB II (even third class). The two played through the season, and the club experienced a small downturn.

In 1972, the team was re-established the KSC-t (before Dózsa Kecskemét), the Sports Club Kecskemét, labdarúgócsapatuk 1974–75–ös first season playing with the KTE. Although the two clubs fluctuated later in the second and third class, their "derby" was always a big city event. The majority of amateurs working KTE is a municipality of the transition of ownership, never felt before in 45 years but, among the fans, has always been more popular in the city.

The 1973–74 NB II season winner again was KTE. In 1978, a strict disciplinary investigation was conducted after the loss of the classifiers in the county championship. A good team player this year, Némedi also suffered a double leg break against the Gyöngyösi Spartacus. Only in 1981 did he manage to return.

After the regime

In 1990, Antal Tóth coached the team to championship in the group NB III, but the Second Division was not able to persist.
In 1995, the third time KTE came up with a second-class, once again won the NB III. This was trainer József Link's hallmarked team as a rookie in the first-place finisher in the autumn season. He moved into the sector KTE Stadium. In 1997 the government "drum beat" the old Kurucz Boulevard path, which in previous years of amateur athletes, the MAV of Kecskemét and the Tiszaug used county-level soccer teams.

In 1999, after the merger between the two clubs, and the KTE and KSC-rated RSC was created from the merger. The team manager János Jámbor was a known entrepreneur and main sponsor. Under head coach Laszlo Nagy, the 2000–01 season champion favorite team created the famous town. The ascent, however, was lost again. Pious in 2003, left Kecskemét football, and transferred the right to play to a revived Vasas.

In 1998, the president, István Pinczés, had elder and junior aged players suspended. KTE revived the football team in the county starting in class III.

In the summer of 2003, the owner of the small circle at the head of Kispest Honvéd, László Koncz and Pál Vida bought the NB I/B in the Büki TK operating Ltd., Kecskemét and the right to NB I/B relaunched the team.

Recent years

The first years of the third millennium brought confusion and many troubles to the football team in Kecskemét. However, this ended in 2006 when Pál Rózsa and János Versegi became the chairmen of KTE. They started to build a strong and successful club, with great support from Dr. Gábor Zombor, mayor of Kecskemét. The promotion to NB I was finally achieved in 2008, and KTE became the first football club from the city of Kecskemét to play in the Hungarian first league.

Today, several thousand citizens attend matches. The local enthusiasm is much greater than the Hungarian average. The first season in the top Hungarian league was very successful for the team. In the Nemzeti Bajnokság I 2008–09 the team finished 5th. The second year was less successful, because in the 2009-10 Nemzeti Bajnokság I season the team finished 10th.

The club reached their zenith in 2011 by winning the Magyar Kupa (Hungarian Cup). On 17 May 2011, the Kecskeméti TE won the Magyar Kupa, beating Videoton in the final 3–2 in the Puskás Ferenc Stadium in Budapest. The victory meant that the club would be able to play their first international match since they qualified for the Europa League.

The centenary year 2011 became the most successful year in the 100-year history of the club. The first international match was played at home in front of 3,400 spectators at the Széktói Stadion in Kecskemét. The final result was 1–1 against the Kazakh Aktobe. The Hungarian goal was scored by Siniša Radanović while the Kazakh goal was scored by Malick Mane.

After the 2014–15 season, the Hungarian Football Federation relegated Kecskemét to the Bács-Kiskun county first division due to financial reasons. In the 2017–18 season, Kecskemét promoted to the third division or in official name to NB III.

Current squad
.

Out on loan

Stadium

Kecskeméti TE plays its home games at Széktói Stadion, built in 1962. With 4,300 seats, and standing room for 2,000 in the standing-only sections, it is the largest football stadium in Kecskemét. In 2002, it was completely renovated. The lighting installation consists of 128 floodlights mounted on four masts 38m in height, and the average vertical illuminance is 1200 lx.

Honours
Hungarian Cup
 Winners (1): 2010–11
Hungarian League 2
 Winners (1): 2007–08
Hungarian League 3
 Winners (4): 1946, 1958, 1989–90, 1994–95

Season results

Notes
 Note 1:

In European Competition

Managers
 János Magó (1937)
 Ernő Singer (1938)
 János Steiner (1947)
 József Fehérvári (1948)
 Ferenc Horváth (1949)
 János Nagy (1951)
 Imre Serényi (1952)
 János Horváth (1952)
 Gyula Dragollovich (1952)
 Károly Kósa (1953)
 Gyula Dragollovich (1953)
 Béla Jánosi (1953)
 Jenő Weisz (1957)
 József Garamszegi (1958)
 Jenő Hauser (1961)
 Károly Kósa (1961)
 Ferenc Molnár (1963)
 József Fejes (1965)
 András Dombóvári (1965–66)
 Jozsef Nemeth (1966)
 Antal Lyka (1967)
 Béla Varga (1971–73)
 Ferenc Máté (1975)
 Rezső Bánáti (1976)
 József Bánhidi (1976)
 István Vereb (1978)
 Gyula Czimmmermann (1983)
 Antal Tóth (1984–91)
 József Linka (1994–97)
 Tibor Gracza (1999)
 László Nagy (1999 – Nov 01)
 Ferenc Gabala (Nov 2001 – May 2)
 József Kiprich (May 2002 – July 3)
 Ioan Patrascu (July 1, 2003 – Oct 1, 2003)
 Tibor Gracza (Oct 2003 – April 4)
 Robert Glázer (April 13, 2004 – Sept 18, 2004)
 György Gálhidi (Sept 8, 2004 – Sept 28, 2004)
 Zoltán Leskó (Sept 2004 – March 5)
 Tibor Gracza (March 2005–05)
 Ioan Patrascu (2005 – Nov 05)
 László Török (Jan 2006 – Sept 06)
 István Varga (Sept 2006 – Jan 07)
 Tamás Nagy (19.01.2007 – 12,.04.2007)
 Tomislav Sivić (p1.08.2007 –21.10.2009)
 Aurél Csertői (28.10.2009 –08.04.2010)
 István Urbányi (08.04.2010 –27.09.2010)
 István Szabó (interim) (Sept 27, 2010 – Oct 13, 2010)
 Tomislav Sivić (Oct 13, 2010 – Nov 23, 2011)
 István Szabó (Dec 13, 2011 – June 30, 2012)
 László Török (July 1, 2012 – Sept 17, 2012)
 István Szabó (interim) (Sept 17, 2012 – Sept 28, 2012)
 Ferenc Horváth (28.09.2012 –24.06.2013)
 Balázs Bekő (24,.06.2013 –30.06.2015)
 István Szabó (01.06.2021 –)

References

External links
Official website 

 
Football clubs in Hungary
Association football clubs established in 1911
1911 establishments in Hungary